Randolph Bedford (born George Randolph Bedford 27 June 1868 – 7 July 1941) was an Australian poet, novelist, short story writer and Queensland state politician.

Early life
Bedford was born in Camperdown, Sydney, the son of Alfred Bedford, who migrated from Yorkshire, England in 1859 and obtained work as a house painter.

He was educated at the Newtown state school. At the age of 14, he worked with a Sydney solicitors firm as an office-boy. At 16 years of age he worked in the western district of New South Wales, shooting rabbits. He carried copies of Carlyle's French Revolution, Shakespeare and the Bible. He worked for a year as a clerk in Hay and joined up with a repertory company run by Edmund Duggan, in Wagga Wagga.

Literary career
Bedford had a short story accepted by The Bulletin in 1886, the first of many contributions. In 1888 he worked for a time on the Argus (Broken Hill, NSW), and in 1889 on The Age, Melbourne for about two years.
Freelancing followed, verse, short stories and sketches, written while travelling in Australia searching for payable mining fields. From 1901 to 1904 Bedford was in Europe and wrote a series of travel sketches. In 1916 these were collected and published under the title of Explorations in Civilization. His first novel, True Eyes and the Whirlwind, appeared in London in 1903, and his Snare of Strength was published two years later. Three short novels appeared afterwards in the Bookstall series, Billy Pagan, Mining Engineer (1911), The Silver Star (1917) and Aladdin and the Boss Cockie (1919), the latter also adapted into a play in four acts. He had also made a collection of his Bulletin verse in 1904, however the unbound sheets were all burned during a fire at the printers, except about six copies which were bound without title-page and apparently given to friends. A few years before his death, Bedford stated that he did not regret the fire as some of the verses included "could only be excused on account of his extreme youth at the time of writing". He was then preparing a selection of his verse for the press which, however, was not published. Other short stories included: Fourteen Fathoms by Quetta Rock and The Language of Animals.

With Australian authors Henry Lawson and Victor Daley et al., he was a member of the elite Dawn and Dusk Club.

Political career
In 1917, Bedford entered the Queensland Legislative Council, on a platform to secure its abolition (which occurred in 1922). In 1923, he was elected as Labor candidate to the Queensland Legislative Assembly for Warrego, a seat which he held until his resignation in 1937 to contest the Division of Maranoa in the Australian House of Representatives. Bedford was defeated, but was again elected to his old seat in the Queensland Legislative Assembly. He had an impatient streak and was not elected to cabinet. He was an ardent Protectionist, and decried the way the wealth of Australia was exported to pay for shoddy goods which could have been produced locally.

Bedford died on 7 July 1941 and was cremated at Mount Thompson crematorium.

Bibliography

Novels
True Eyes and the Whirlwind (1903)
The Snare of Strength (1905)
Sops of Wine (1909)
Billy Pagan Mining Engineer (1911)
The Mates of Torres (1911)
The Lady of the Pickup (1911)
The Silver Star (1917)
Aladdin and the Boss Cockie (1919)

Non-fiction
Explorations in Civilization (1914)

Autobiography
Naught to Thirty-Three (1944)

References

Additional sources listed by the Dictionary of Australian Biography:
The Courier-Mail, Brisbane, 8 July 1941; The Bulletin, 16 July 1941; The Worker, Brisbane, 8 July 1941; E. Morris Miller, Australian Literature; Nettie Palmer, Modern Australian Literature; See also, Randolph Bedford, Naught to Thirty-three.

Additional sources listed by the Australian Dictionary of Biography:
G. Blainey, Mines in the Spinifex (Syd, 1960); C. Lack (ed), Three Decades of Queensland Political History, 1929–1960 (Brisb, 1962); N. Lindsay, Bohemians of the Bulletin (Syd, 1965); L. A. Lindsay, Comedy of Life (Syd, 1967); R. Lindsay, Model Wife (Syd, 1967); Overland, no 26, 1963; Bulletin, 12 February 1894, 4 January 1912; Australasian (Melbourne), 30 October 1920; Sydney Morning Herald, 4 June 1924, 26 October 1929, 18 November 1933, 9 Feb 28 July 1934, 6 Feb 30, 31 May 1935; Bedford papers (State Library of Queensland); Alfred Deakin papers (National Library of Australia); A1 and A3 series lists (National Archives of Australia).

1868 births
1941 deaths
20th-century Australian novelists
Australian male novelists
Australian poets
Australian male short story writers
Members of the Queensland Legislative Assembly
Members of the Queensland Legislative Council
Australian male poets
Australian Labor Party members of the Parliament of Queensland
20th-century Australian short story writers
20th-century Australian male writers